Kintla Lake is a lake in the northwestern portion of Glacier National Park in Montana. The lake is located in a rather remote portion of the park, close to the Canada–United States border. The lake is a  drive from the west entrance along bumpy dirt roads. At , Kintla Lake is only slightly smaller than Bowman Lake, and is the fourth largest lake in the park.

Kintla originates from the Kutenai word for "sack". Kutenai legend states that a man had apparently drowned in one of the lakes which likened the lake to a sack where "once you got in, you couldn't get out".

Canoeing and kayaking are ideal on the lake, as no motorized watercraft are allowed.  There is a quiet campground on the lake, and it is rarely filled because of its remote location.  Fishing is also popular on the lake, because of the trout found in it. There are also options for day hikes and extended hikes into the backcountry in the area.

See also
List of lakes in Flathead County, Montana (A-L)

References

Lakes of Glacier National Park (U.S.)
Lakes of Flathead County, Montana